The Iran–Pakistan gas pipeline, also known as the Peace pipeline, or IP Gas, is an under-construction  pipeline to deliver natural gas from Iran to Pakistan.

History

Inception
The idea was conceived by a young Pakistani civil engineer Malik Aftab Ahmed Khan (Sitara e Jurat), a graduate of NED University, in mid-1950, when an article of his was published by the Military College of Engineering, Risalpur, Pakistan. The article Persian Pipeline also mentioned the method for its protection along the hostile territory by establishing mini battalion-size cantonments along its proposed route through Balochistan/Sindh. The project was conceptualized in 1989 by Rajendra K. Pachauri in partnership with Ali Shams Ardekani and Sarwar Shar, former Deputy Foreign Minister of Iran. Pachauri proposed the plan to both Iranian and Indian governments. The government of Iran responded positively to the proposal. At the 2012 annual conference of the International Association of Energy Economics, Ardekani backed Pachauri's proposal.

Timeline
Discussions between the governments of Iran and Pakistan started in 1995. A preliminary agreement was signed in 1995. This agreement foresaw construction of a pipeline from South Pars gas field to Karachi in Pakistan. Later Iran made a proposal to extend the pipeline from Pakistan into India. In February 1999, a preliminary agreement between Iran and India was signed.

In 2004 the project was revived after the UNDP's report Peace and Prosperity Gas Pipelines by Pakistani petroleum engineer, Gulfaraz Ahmed, was published in December 2003. The report highlighted benefits of the pipeline to Pakistan, India and Iran.

In February 2007, India and Pakistan agreed to pay Iran US$4.93 per million British thermal units (US$4.67/GJ) but some details relating to price adjustment remained open to further negotiation.

In April 2008, Iran expressed interest in the People's Republic of China's participation in the project. In August 2010, Iran invited Bangladesh to join the project.

In 2009, India withdrew from the project over pricing and security issues, and after signing a civilian nuclear deal with the United States in 2008. However, in March 2010 India called on Pakistan and Iran for trilateral talks to be held in May 2010 in Tehran.

On 4 September 2012, the project was announced to commence before October 2012 and be completed by December 2014.

On 30 January 2013, the Pakistan's federal government approved a deal with Iran for laying the Pakistan's segment of a pipeline. On 27 February 2013, the construction of the Pakistani section was agreed. On 11 March 2013, the construction work on the Pakistani section of the pipeline was inaugurated by president of Pakistan Asif Ali Zardari and president of Iran Mahmoud Ahmadinejad. According with Javad Owji, managing director of the National Iranian Gas Company, the pipeline in Pakistan is expected to be constructed in 22 months with the participation of Iran.

On 27 May 2013, Iranian deputy minister for petroleum, A. Khaledi, in a letter to the Pakistan government expressed concern over the delay in the start of the Pakistani portion of the pipeline. He said that after a government-to-government agreement between the two countries, they were supposed to select entities for the construction of the latter part of the pipeline. Pakistan still hasn't officially nominated Tadbir Energy and local sub-contractors to begin work on the Pakistani half of the pipeline.

On 12 June 2013, the newly elected prime minister of Pakistan, Nawaz Sharif, allayed any fears regarding the abandonment of the project and said that the Pakistani government is committed to the fulfillment of the project and targets the first flow of gas from the pipeline in December 2014. The premier also stated that his government is planning to commit to the Turkmenistan-Afghanistan-Pakistan-India gas pipeline project as well.

On 28 November 2013, a 'friendly' country anonymously offers $1 billion to help fund the pipeline. 

On 10-November-2013, a meeting between Pakistan Federal Minister for Petroleum and Natural Resources Shahid Khaqan Abbasi and Iranian Minister of Petroleum Bijan Namdar Zangeneh held at the Ministry of Petroleum at Tehran. The Pakistani Officials assured their Iranian counterparts that project would continue despite "external pressure".

On 25-Feb-2014, Minister for Petroleum and Natural Resources Pakistan, Shahid Khaqan Abbasi told the National Assembly that the project for the moment is off the table, he cited international sanctions as the issue, he said " In the absence of international sanctions the project can be completed within three years, but the government cannot take it any further at the moment because international sanctions against Iran are a serious issue". Pakistan will face the penalty if it failed to lay its side of pipeline till December 2014. Analysts however points at Saudi Arabia's pressure to not to carry out the project.

Iran plans to abandon this pipeline project, as per April 2014 news article.

During the state visit of Prime Minister Nawaz Sharif to Iran in May 2014, both the government stated to remain committed on the completion of the pipeline and also agreed to extend the completion date by one year. However, on 30 May 2014, ISNA news agency quoted Iranian Deputy Oil Minister for International and Trade Affairs Ali Majedi as claiming that the deadline has not been extended as no such agreement was signed during Nawaz Sharif's visit and the deadline to complete is still December, 2014.

During the year 2017, India is planning to disassociate from this pipeline project and working on cheaper independent under sea pipe line directly from Iran.

As of early 2019, the project remains substantially delayed.  While the Iranian section of the pipeline has been completed, the Pakistani section remains under construction and subject to renewed delays thanks to concerns about the US sanctions regime<ref>{{Cite web|url=https://eurasiantimes.com/islamabad-keen-to-complete-super-delayed-iran-pakistan-gas-pipeline/|title=Islamabad Keen To Complete Super-Delayed' Iran-Pakistan Gas Pipeline|last=Times|first=EurAsian|date=2019-05-08|website=EurAsian Times: Latest Asian, Middle-East, EurAsian, Indian News|language=en-US|access-date=2019-05-11}}</ref>

Controversies
In January 2010, the United States asked Pakistan to abandon the pipeline project. If canceling the project, Pakistan would receive assistance from the United States for construction of a liquefied natural gas terminal and importing electricity from Tajikistan through Afghanistan's Wakhan Corridor. However, on 16 March 2010 in Ankara, Iran and Pakistan signed an agreement on the pipeline. According to the agreement each country must complete its section by 2014. In July 2011, Iran announced that it has completed construction of its section. If Pakistan does not fulfill its obligation to complete the pipeline on its side by the end of 2014, it will have to pay a daily penalty of $1 million to Iran until completion. On 13 March 2012 Pakistan's ministry of finance announced that private investors were showing diminished interest and that the government might have to impose a tax on consumers, or seek government-to-government arrangements with Iran, China and Russia to build the pipeline. On 29 March it was reported that officials from Pakistan's petroleum ministry would travel to Russia in early April for talks with Gazprom. Then, in a 7 April article the Pakistani daily PakTribune'' reported that Gazprom would both finance and construct the pipeline. This would require setting aside the Public Procurement Regulatory Authority rules which require international bidding for such a large project. The Economic Coordination Committee would be asked in its next meeting to give such permission. The article also informed that the reason the private consortium no longer would contribute to the project was US opposition.

On 15 April 2012, it was reported through unnamed diplomatic sources in Islamabad that Saudi Arabia was offering to deliver an "alternative package" to Pakistan if the country abandoned its cooperation with Iran. In addition to oil the package would also include a cash loan and oil facility. The news came in connection with a visit to Pakistan by the Saudi deputy foreign minister.

On 1 May 2012, it was reported that Pakistan's foreign minister, Hina Rabbani Khar had said that Islamabad will not give in to US pressures to mothball the project and will finish the huge pipeline project "at any cost" and that the project was in line with the country's national interest.

On 29 January 2013, US consul general Michael Dodman threatened Pakistan with economical sanctions if it does not abandon the project.

In late October 2013, Sustainable Policy Development Institute published a report in which the proposed pipeline was termed as "death sentence" for Pakistan. Since the prices in the contract are linked to crude oil prices, the government "blatantly ignored the energy dynamics and its pricing while going for this deal". The gas sold to Pakistan will be higher priced than the current domestic prices of gas in the country.

Route 
It starts from Asalouyeh and stretches  through Iran. The Iranian section is known as Iran's seventh cross-country gas pipeline. The first  part of this section runs from Asalouyeh to Iranshahr. The second  part runs from Iranshahr to the Iran–Pakistan border.

It will pass through Baluchistan and Sindh. In Khuzdar, a branch would spur off to Karachi, while the main pipeline will continue towards Multan. From Multan, the pipeline may be expanded to Delhi. The route in Pakistan may be changed if China will participate in the project.

As there are concerns over the pipeline being attacked by Baluchi insurgents, an alternative offshore route from Iran to the maritime boundary between India and Pakistan off Kutch was proposed. According to this proposal, from there one branch was to run to Pakistan while other branch to run to Kutch.

Technical description 
It is expected to cost US$7.5 billion and to be commissioned by 2013.

Authorities blamed Lack of safety measures and old infrastructure for the Thursday 14 March 2019 explosion in a gas pipeline near the city of Mahshahr in southern Iran. One child, one woman and two others were killed in the explosion.

Companies
In different times several companies have been interested to build the pipeline. Companies included Gazprom, BHP, National Iranian Gas Company, Petronas, and Total. A consortium consisting of Royal Dutch Shell, BG Group, Petronas and an Iranian business group had negotiated on exporting of gas from South Pars to Pakistan. From India, GAIL had been involved. However, the pipeline's section in Iran was built by the National Iranian Gas Company. It used Khatam al-Anbia as a subcontractor. In Pakistan, Inter State Gas Systems is responsible for the construction of the pipeline.	
 The contract for engineering, procurement, construction and financing of the Pakistan's section was signed with Iran's Tadbir Energy. Iran agreed to provide a $500 million loan for construction payable in 20 years. However, on 13-December-2013, Pakistan's Minister for Petroleum and Natural Resources Shahid Khaqan Abbasi said that Iran refused to fund the project citing 'acute financial constraint' as the reason. Pakistan authorities however said to remain committed with the project. Both sides have decided to constitute a working group which would re-establish in two months the new parameters for the projects, including a new time-frame and other important issues involving financing of pipeline to be laid down in the territory of Pakistan.

See also 

 Turkmenistan–Afghanistan–Pakistan–India Pipeline
 Iran–Pakistan relations
 List of power stations in Iran
 List of power stations in Pakistan
 Energy in Iran

References

External links
 Iran-Pakistan-India Pipeline: A View from Washington by Gal Luft, 15 June 2007.
 Iran-Pakistan pipeline: Iran’s new lifeline by Gal Luft, 29 May 2009.

1994 in Pakistan
1994 in Iran
Natural gas pipelines in Pakistan
Natural gas pipelines in Iran
Proposed pipelines in Asia
Proposed energy infrastructure in Pakistan
Projects established in 2014
Iran–Pakistan relations
India–Iran relations
India–Pakistan relations